"Ten Days" is a song by Australian singer-songwriter Missy Higgins, written by Higgins and Jay Clifford of Jump, Little Children. It was the second single released from her debut album, The Sound of White (2004), on 15 November 2004. "Ten Days" peaked at  12 on the Australian ARIA Singles Chart. The Australian Recording Industry Association awarded the song a gold disc for selling over 35,000 copies. It was also voted No. 6 song on the Triple J Hottest 100 of 2004. The video features Higgins travelling to various places and many of the shots were filmed in Adelaide, South Australia.

Background
Higgins signed a recording contract with Eleven while still at high school. After she left school she spent much of 2002 on a backpacking trip to Europe. When she returned she began writing music for her debut album, The Sound of White. The lyrics for "Ten Days" were inspired by Higgins' breakup with her boyfriend when she travelled to Europe. The song was written by Higgins and Jay Clifford, the guitarist and lead singer of American band Jump, Little Children.

Release and reception
"Ten Days" was released in Australia on 15 November 2004. It entered the ARIA Singles Chart at No. 14 and later rose to No. 12, its peak, on 23 January 2005. It stayed on the chart for 20 weeks and was certified gold. "Ten Days" was released in the United Kingdom on 30 May 2005, Higgins' first single to be released there. In 2005, the song was nominated for an Australasian Performing Right Association (APRA) award for Song of the Year but lost to Higgins' debut single, "Scar". The music video for "Ten Days" features footage of Higgins travelling through Europe.

Awards and nominations

Nominations
2005 APRA Awards, Song of the Year

Track listing
Australian CD single
 "Ten Days"
 "Greed for Your Love" (live)
 "Scar" (live)
 "The Special Two" (live)

Charts

Weekly charts

Year-end charts

Certifications

References

External links
 

2004 singles
Missy Higgins songs
2004 songs
Eleven: A Music Company singles
Songs written by Missy Higgins